Kalateh-ye Bala (also Romanized as Kalāteh-ye Bālā, Kalāteh Bala, and Kalāteh-i-Bāla) is a village in Qaen Rural District, in the Central District of Qaen County, South Khorasan Province, Iran. At the 2006 census, its population was 921, in 269 families.

References 

Populated places in Qaen County